Arcadio Padilla (born 12 January 1941) is a Mexican rower. He competed at the 1960 Summer Olympics, the 1968 Summer Olympics and the 1972 Summer Olympics.

References

External links
 

1941 births
Living people
Mexican male rowers
Olympic rowers of Mexico
Rowers at the 1960 Summer Olympics
Rowers at the 1968 Summer Olympics
Rowers at the 1972 Summer Olympics
Rowers from Mexico City
Pan American Games medalists in rowing
Pan American Games bronze medalists for Mexico
Rowers at the 1967 Pan American Games
20th-century Mexican people
21st-century Mexican people